Nothing But the Truth is a 1920 American silent comedy film directed by David Kirkland and starring Taylor Holmes, Elsie Mackay and Ned Sparks. It is based on the 1914 novel Nothing But the Truth by Frederic S. Isham, and the 1916 Broadway play inspired by it.

Cast
 Taylor Holmes as 	Robert Bennett
 Elsie Mackay as Gwendolyn Gerald
 Ned Sparks as 	The Monocle Man 
 Marcelle Carroll as 	Dolly
 Ben Hendricks Sr. as Commodore Dan 
 Radcliffe Steele as The Hammer-Thrower
 Elizabeth Garrison as Mrs. Clarence
 Charles Craig as 	Mr. Clarence
 Colin Campbell as Dickie
 Beth Franklyn as Mrs. Ralston
 Edna Phillips as Mrs. Commodore Dan

References

Bibliography
 Connelly, Robert B. The Silents: Silent Feature Films, 1910-36, Volume 40, Issue 2. December Press, 1998.
 Munden, Kenneth White. The American Film Institute Catalog of Motion Pictures Produced in the United States, Part 1. University of California Press, 1997.

External links
 

1920 films
1920 comedy films
1920s English-language films
American silent feature films
Silent American comedy films
American black-and-white films
Films directed by David Kirkland
Metro Pictures films
Films based on American novels
1920s American films